Batocera inconspicua is a species of beetle in the family Cerambycidae. It was described by Van de Poll in 1890. It is known from New Guinea and the Solomon Islands. The species measures between 49 and 63 millimeters. It contains the varietas Batocera inconspicua var. germanica.

References

Batocerini
Beetles described in 1890